James Meadows (born 15 May 1999) is an English professional rugby league footballer who plays as a  or  for the Batley Bulldogs in the Betfred Championship.

He previously played for the London Broncos in the Super League and the Championship, and spent time on loan from the Broncos at the London Skolars and the Coventry Bears in League 1, and the Sheffield Eagles in the Betfred Championship.

Career

London Broncos
Meadows made his professional début for the London Broncos against the Barrow Raiders on 4 Feb 2018 in Round 1 of the Championship.

Batley Bulldogs
On 12 Oct 2021 it was reported that he had signed for Batley Bulldogs in the RFL Championship

Club statistics

References

External links
London Broncos profile
SL profile
Meet James Meadows – The studious Broncos teenager causing a Championship stir

1999 births
Living people
Batley Bulldogs players
Coventry Bears players
London Broncos players
London Skolars players
Rugby league halfbacks
Rugby league five-eighths
Rugby league players from London
Sheffield Eagles players